Lee Chan-hyuk (born September 12, 1996), is a South Korean singer-songwriter, producer and author. He debuted as a member of the sibling duo AKMU in April 2014, under YG Entertainment.

Life and career

1996–2013: Early life
Lee Chan-hyuk was born on September 12, 1996, in Gyeonggi-do, South Korea. Both Chan-hyuk and his younger sister, Lee Su-hyun, moved to Mongolia with their missionary parents for five years, while being home-schooled by their mother, before returning to South Korea. In August 2012, the siblings auditioned for the second installment of SBS reality survival program K-pop Star as Akdong Musician. The sibling duo finished in first place, later choosing to sign under YG Entertainment as they were the only label from the three to provide them the creative freedom they wished for throughout the show, believing their artistry would not be restricted or altered.

2014–present: AKMU and military enlistment

On April 7, 2014, Chan-hyuk and Su-hyun officially debuted as AKMU (Akdong Musician) with their studio album Play, instantly becoming a commercial success. The sibling duo has since released two more studio albums, two extended plays, one single album and ten singles in their discography. In September 2017, Lee enlisted in the Korean Marine Corps for his mandatory military service, thus temporarily halting all AKMU activities until his return. In midst of his service, it was revealed the Korean Marines officially chose Lee's self-written song, "Marine Triumph" (해병승전가), to represent the Corps. Lee completed his mandatory military service on May 29, 2019, and was discharged. His first appearance since hiatus was as AKMU on JTBC variety program Knowing Bros, where the episode was filmed the day after his release.

On September 26, 2019, Lee published his first novel Fish Meets Water (물 만난 물고기), a day after AKMU's album Sailing was released. The novel portrays his perspective on life values and art, and it correlates with the album. The novel became the number one best selling novel in South Korean bookstores. Three years later, Lee published the picture book Alien in collaboration with illustrator Lee Yoon-woo, based on the lyrics he wrote for Su-hyun's first single, "Alien".

On October 5, 2022, YG Entertainment announced that Lee will release his debut album, Error, on October 17.

Discography

Studio albums

Singles

Other songs

Filmography

Film

Television show

Bibliography 
 Fish Meets Water (2019)
 Alien (2022)

Notes

References 

AKMU members
1996 births
Living people
21st-century South Korean male singers
South Korean child singers
YG Entertainment artists
K-pop Star winners
South Korean expatriates in Mongolia
Republic of Korea Marine Corps personnel